Joseph Kabila Kabange (born 4 June 1971) is a Congolese politician who served as President of the Democratic Republic of the Congo between January 2001 and January 2019. He took office ten days after the assassination of his father, President Laurent-Désiré Kabila in the context of the Second Congo War. He was allowed to remain in power after the 2003 Pretoria Accord ended the war as the president of the country's new transitional government. He was elected as president in 2006 and re-elected in 2011 for a second term. Since stepping down after the 2018 election, Kabila, as a former president, serves as a senator for life.

Kabila's term was due to expire on 20 December 2016, according to the terms of the constitution adopted in 2006. Officials suggested that elections would be held in November 2016, but on 29 September 2016, the nation's electoral authority announced that the election would not be held until early 2018. Talk focused on the need for a census before holding elections. In August 2018, Kabila announced that he would step down and not seek reelection in the December 2018 general election. He was succeeded by Félix Tshisekedi in the country's first peaceful transition of power since independence.

While in power, Joseph Kabila faced continuous wars in eastern Congo and internal rebel forces supported by the neighboring governments of Uganda and Rwanda.

Early life and education
Joseph Kabila Kabange and his twin sister Jaynet Kabila were born on 4 June 1971. According to official accounts, the twins were born at Hewabora, a small village in the Fizi territory of the South Kivu province, in eastern Congo. Rumors have abounded that Kabila was actually born in Tanzania, which would make him a citizen of that country. He is the son of long time rebel, former AFDL leader and president of the Congo Laurent-Désiré Kabila and Sifa Mahanya.

Kabila's childhood coincided with the low point of his father's political and military career. He was raised in relative remoteness, with few records of his early days. Kabila attended a primary school organized by his father's rebel forces, before moving to Tanzania where he completed primary and secondary school. Due to his father's status as an enemy of Zairean strongman Mobutu Sese Seko, Kabila posed as a Tanzanian in his school years to avoid detection by Zairean intelligence agents.

Career

Guerrilla and army years
Following high school, Kabila followed a military curriculum in Tanzania, then at Makerere University in Uganda. In October 1996, Laurent-Désiré Kabila launched the campaign in Zaire to oust the Mobutu regime with his newly formed army, the Alliance of Democratic Forces for the Liberation of Congo-Zaire (AFDL). Joseph Kabila became the commander of an AFDL unit that included "kadogos" (child soldiers) and likely played a key role in major battles on the road to Kinshasa, but his exact whereabouts during the war have been difficult to establish. Joseph Kabila appears to have been present at the liberation of Kisangani where media reports identified him as commander of the rebel force that took the city after four days of intense fighting.

Following the AFDL's victory, and Laurent-Désiré Kabila's rise to the presidency, Joseph Kabila went on to get further training at the PLA National Defense University, in Beijing, China.

When he returned from China, Kabila was awarded the rank of major-general, and appointed Deputy Chief of Staff of the Armed Forces of the Democratic Republic of the Congo, in 1998. He was later, in 2000, appointed Chief of Staff of the Land Forces, a position he held until the elder President Kabila's assassination in January 2001. As chief of staff, he was one of the main military leaders in charge of government troops during the time of the Second Congo War (1998–2003).

First presidential term

Kabila rose to the presidency on 26 January 2001 after the assassination of Laurent-Désiré Kabila, becoming the world's first head of government born in the 1970s. Aged 29, he was considered young and inexperienced. He subsequently attempted to end the ongoing civil war by negotiating peace agreements with rebel groups backed by Rwanda and Uganda, the same regional armies who had brought Laurent-Désiré Kabila's rebel group to power three years before. The 2002 peace agreement signed at the Inter-Congolese Dialogue in Sun City, South Africa, which nominally ended the Second Congo War, maintained Joseph Kabila as President and head of state of the Congo. An interim administration was set up under him, including the leaders of the country's two main rebel groups as vice-presidents (two other vice-presidents were representatives of the civilian opposition and government supporters respectively).
On 28 March 2004, an apparent coup attempt or mutiny around the capital Kinshasa, allegedly by members of the former guard of former president Mobutu Sese Seko (who had been ousted by Kabila's father in 1997 and died in the same year), failed. On 11 June 2004, coup plotters led by Major Eric Lenge allegedly attempted to take power and announced on state radio that the transitional government was suspended, but were defeated by loyalist troops.

In December 2005, a partial referendum  approved a new constitution, and a presidential election was held on 30 July 2006, having been delayed from an earlier date in June. The new constitution lowered the minimum age of presidential candidates from 35 to 30; Kabila turned 35 shortly before the election. In March 2006, he registered as a candidate. Although Kabila registered as an independent, he is the "initiator" of the People's Party for Reconstruction and Democracy (PPRD), which chose him as their candidate in the election. Although the new constitution stipulates that a debate be held between the two remaining candidates for the presidency, no debates took place and many declared this unconstitutional.

According to widely disputed provisional results announced on 20 August, Kabila won 45% of the vote; his main opponent, vice-president and former rebel leader Jean-Pierre Bemba, won 20%. The irregularities surrounding the elections results prompted a run-off vote between Kabila and Bemba which was held on 29 October. On 15 November, the electoral commission announced the official results and Kabila was declared the winner, with 58.05% of the vote. These results were confirmed by the Supreme Court on 27 November 2006, and Kabila was inaugurated on 6 December 2006 as the country's newly elected president. He named Antoine Gizenga, who placed third in the first round of the presidential election (and then backed Kabila in the second round) as prime minister on 30 December.

In 2006, Kabila responded to evidence of widespread sex crimes committed by the Congolese military by describing the acts as "simply unforgivable". He pointed out that 300 soldiers had been convicted of sex crimes, although he added that this was not enough.

Second term

In December 2011, Kabila was re-elected for a second term as president. After the results were announced on 9 December, there was violent unrest in Kinshasa and Mbuji-Mayi, where official tallies showed that a strong majority had voted for the opposition candidate Etienne Tshisekedi. Official observers from the Carter Center reported that returns from almost 2,000 polling stations in areas where support for Tshisekedi was strong had been lost and not included in the official results. They described the election as lacking credibility. On 20 December, Kabila was sworn in for a second term, promising to invest in infrastructure and public services. However, Tshisekedi maintained that the result of the election was illegitimate and said that he intended also to "swear himself in" as president.

In January 2012, Catholic bishops in DR Congo also condemned the elections, complaining of "treachery, lies and terror", and calling on the election commission to correct "serious errors".

On 17 January 2015, Congo's parliament passed an electoral law requiring a census before the next elections. On 19 January protests led by students at the University of Kinshasa broke out. The protests began following the announcement of a proposed law that would allow Kabila to remain in power until a national census could be conducted (elections had been planned for 2016). By Wednesday 21 January clashes between police and protesters had claimed at least 42 lives, although the government claimed only 15 people had been killed.

The Senate responded to protests by striking the census requirement from its law. Moïse Katumbi announced in October 2015 that he would leave the ruling party due to disagreements over the scheduled election.

Jaynet Kabila, the sister of Kabila, was named in the Panama Papers. Document leaks in 2016 revealed that she is a part-owner of a major Congolese television company, through offshore subsidiaries.

Kabila is vastly unpopular, partly because of the conflicts in the Congo, but also because of the widespread belief that he has enriched himself and his family while ignoring millions of poor Congolese. There have been protests against his attempts to change term limits and extend his rule. Harsh demonstrations erupted on 20 April 2016 in Lubumbashi, one of Congo's biggest cities.

When Moise Katumbi, the former governor of Katanga Province in the Democratic Republic of Congo and now an opposition figure, announced that he was running for president in an election that was supposed to be held by the end of 2016, his house was surrounded by security forces wanting to arrest him.

Although Kabila's forces have scored an important victory against one large rebel group, the M23, in 2013, many other armed groups have splintered into dangerous movements. And by 2016 new ones had risen, like militias in the Nyunzu area that have killed hundreds of people.

2016 delayed election and extension of presidency
According to the Constitution of the Democratic Republic of the Congo, President Kabila should not be allowed to serve more than two terms. On 19 September 2016, massive protests rocked Kinshasa calling for him to step down as legally mandated. Seventeen people were killed. Elections to determine a successor to Kabila were originally scheduled to be held on 27 November 2016. On 29 September 2016, the nation's electoral authority announced that the election would not be held until early 2018. According to the electoral commission's vice president, the commission "hasn't called elections in 2016 because the number of voters isn't known." However, the opposition alleges that Kabila had intentionally delayed the election to remain in power.

Partially in response to the delayed election, the United States issued sanctions against two members of Kabila's inner circle, John Numbi and Gabriel Amisi Kumba, on 28 September. These actions were seen as a warning to President Kabila to respect his country's constitution.

More demonstrations were planned to mark the passing of the end of the presidential mandate. Opposition groups claim that the outcome of late elections would be civil war.

Maman Sidikou, the Secretary-General's Special Representative for DR Congo and head of MONUSCO, said that a tipping point into uncontrollable violence could come about very quickly if the political situation is not normalised.

Kabila's second term as president of the Democratic Republic of Congo was due to end on 20 December 2016. A statement issued by his spokesperson on 19 December 2016, stated that Joseph Kabila would remain in post until a new president is in place following elections which will not be held until at least April 2018. Kabila subsequently installed a new cabinet led by prime minister Samy Badibanga, resulting in protests in which at least 40 people were killed. Under articles 75 and 76 of the Constitution of the Democratic Republic of Congo, should the office of the president become vacant, the Chairman of the Senate, presently Léon Kengo would assume the presidency in an acting capacity.

On 23 December, an agreement was proposed between the main opposition group and the Kabila government under which the latter agreed not to alter the constitution and to leave office before the end of 2017.  Under the agreement opposition leader Étienne Tshisekedi will oversee that the deal is implemented and the country's Prime Minister will be appointed by the opposition.

In late February 2018 the ministry of international affairs of Botswana told Kabila that it was time to go and said the "worsening humanitarian situation" in DRC is compounded by the fact that "its leader has persistently delayed holding elections, and has lost control over the security of his country".

On December 30, 2018 the presidential election to determine the successor to Kabila was held. Kabila endorsed Emmanuel Ramazani Shadary, his former interior minister. On January 10, 2019, the electoral commission announced opposition candidate Félix Tshisekedi as the winner of the vote.

After presidency 

Since leaving the presidency, Kabila has made Kingakati farm his main residence. The estate, located 50 km east of Kinshasa, was his second home while he was still in power.

In April 2021, President Felix Tshisekedi succeeded to oust the last remaining elements of his government who were loyal to former leader Kabila.

In May 2021, Tshisekedi called for a review of mining contracts signed with China by Kabila, especially the Sicomines multibillion 'minerals-for-infrastructure' deal.

In November 2021, a judicial investigation targeting Kabila and his associates was opened in Kinshasa after revelations of alleged embezzlement of $138 million.

Personal life
Kabila married Olive Lembe di Sita, on 1 June 2006. The wedding ceremonies took place on 17 June 2006. Kabila and his spouse have a daughter, born in 2001, named Sifa, after Kabila's mother.

As Kabila is Protestant and Lembe di Sita is Catholic, the wedding ceremonies were ecumenical; they were officiated by both the Catholic Archbishop of Kinshasa, Cardinal Frederic Etsou Bamungwabi, and Pierre Marini Bodho – presiding bishop of the Church of Christ in Congo, the umbrella church for most denominations in the Congo, known within the country simply as "The Protestant Church".

In July 2021, Joseph Kabila finished his master's degree, getting the certification from the University of Johannesburg in South Africa. He completed Master's programme in Political Science and International Relations through distance learning.

References

Further reading 
 Potgieter, De Wet and Khadija Patel. "Congo rebels, a Kabila family affair?" (Archive). The Daily Maverick. 11 February 2013.

External links

 Joseph Kabila, The Untold Story
 Rape in the DRC
 BBC Country Profile
 Official website of the President of the DRC
 Joseph Kabila 2011 campaign site 
 Democratic Republic of the Congo – Permanent Mission to the United Nations
 DR Congo presidential candidates face off in second round Jane's Intelligence Watch Report, 22 August 2006
 For Congo's Leader, Middling Reviews by Jeffrey Gettleman, The New York Times, 4 April 2009

1971 births
Living people
People from South Kivu
Presidents of the Democratic Republic of the Congo
Senators for life
People's Party for Reconstruction and Democracy politicians
Democratic Republic of the Congo military personnel
People of the M23 rebellion
Democratic Republic of the Congo twins
Children of national leaders
Democratic Republic of the Congo Anglicans
Makerere University alumni
University of Johannesburg alumni
20th-century Democratic Republic of the Congo people
21st-century Democratic Republic of the Congo politicians